The Mauch Chunk Group is a geologic group in West Virginia. It preserves fossils dating back to the Carboniferous period.

See also

 List of fossiliferous stratigraphic units in West Virginia

References
 

Geologic groups of West Virginia